The 2009 Riviera di Rimini Challenger was a professional tennis tournament played on outdoor red clay courts. It was the sixth edition of the tournament which was part of the 2009 ATP Challenger Tour. It took place in Rimini, Italy between 13 and 19 July 2009.

Singles main-draw entrants

Seeds

 Rankings are as of July 6, 2009.

Other entrants
The following players received wildcards into the singles main draw:
  Daniele Bracciali
  Juan Ignacio Chela
  Rubén Ramírez Hidalgo
  Filippo Volandri

The following players received special exempt into the singles main draw:
  Jan Minář
  Albert Ramos Viñolas

The following players received entry from the qualifying draw:
  Enrico Burzi
  Farrukh Dustov
  Daniele Giorgini
  Gianluca Naso
  Marc Sieber (as a Lucky Loser)

Champions

Singles

 Thomaz Bellucci def.  Juan Pablo Brzezicki, 3–6, 6–3, 6–1

Doubles

 Matthias Bachinger /  Dieter Kindlmann def.  Leonardo Azzaro /  Marco Crugnola, 6–4, 6–2

References
Official website
ITF Search 

Riviera di Rimini Challenger
Clay court tennis tournaments
Riviera di Rimini Challenger